Cyphanthera is a genus of shrubs in the family Solanaceae.

The species, which are endemic to Australia, include:
Cyphanthera albicans (A.Cunn.) Miers
Cyphanthera anthocercidea (F.Muell.) Haegi
Cyphanthera microphylla Miers
Cyphanthera miersiana Haegi
Cyphanthera myosotidea (F.Muell.) Haegi
Cyphanthera odgersii (F.Muell.) Haegi
Cyphanthera racemosa (F.Muell.) Haegi
Cyphanthera scabrella (Benth.) Miers
Cyphanthera tasmanica Miers

References

Nicotianoideae
Solanaceae genera